Aleksey  Igorevich Kuznetsov (born February 1, 1983) is a Kazakhstani professional ice hockey goaltender. He currently plays for Yugra Khanty-Mansiysk of the Kontinental Hockey League (KHL).

Kuznetsov competed at the 2010 IIHF World Championship as a member of the Kazakhstan men's national ice hockey team.

References

External links

1983 births
Living people
Amur Khabarovsk players
Avangard Omsk players
Barys Nur-Sultan players
HC Sibir Novosibirsk players
HC Yugra players
Kazakhstani ice hockey goaltenders
Kazakhstani people of Russian descent
Kazzinc-Torpedo players
Sportspeople from Oskemen
Saryarka Karagandy players
Zauralie Kurgan players